Sylwester Patejuk (born November 30, 1982) is a Polish footballer who plays for Wisła Puławy.

Career

Club
He joined Podbeskidzie Bielsko-Biała in July 2009.

In June 2012, he joined Śląsk Wrocław.

In 2016, Patejuk signed for Wisła Puławy.

References

External links
 

1982 births
Living people
Polish footballers
Podbeskidzie Bielsko-Biała players
Śląsk Wrocław players
Zawisza Bydgoszcz players
Ekstraklasa players
Place of birth missing (living people)
Association football forwards
Wisła Puławy players
Footballers from Warsaw